Ladislao Mazurkiewicz Iglesias (14 February 1945 – 2 January 2013) was a Uruguayan footballer who played as a goalkeeper.

Career
Mazurkiewicz helped the Uruguay national team qualify for the semifinals of the 1970 World Cup, where the charrúas were stopped by the eventual champion, Brazil. He was elected the best goalkeeper of that tournament. He also played for the Brazilian side Atlético Mineiro.

During his international career (1965–74), he earned a total of 37 appearances with the national team of his native Uruguay. He coached Peñarol from 1988–89.

Personal life
Mazurkiewicz's father was Polish and his mother Spanish. Though of Polish ancestry, he did not know Polish and never visited Poland.

Death
Mazurkiewicz died on 2 January 2013 in Montevideo, Uruguay, aged 67, from undisclosed causes. He is buried at Parque del Recuerdo cemetery.

Honours

Club

Peñarol 

 Primera División: 1965, 1966, 1967, 1968, 1981
 Copa Libertadores: 1966
 Intercontinental Cup: 1966

Atlético Mineiro 

 Série A: 1971

América Cali 

 Categoría Primera A: 1979

International

Uruguay 

 Copa América: 1967

Uruguay U20 

 South American U-20 Championship: 1964

References

1945 births
2013 deaths
People from Piriápolis
Uruguayan footballers
Association football goalkeepers
Uruguay international footballers
1966 FIFA World Cup players
1970 FIFA World Cup players
1974 FIFA World Cup players
Uruguayan Primera División players
Campeonato Brasileiro Série A players
La Liga players
Categoría Primera A players
Peñarol players
Clube Atlético Mineiro players
Granada CF footballers
Cobreloa footballers
América de Cali footballers
Copa América-winning players
Copa Libertadores-winning players
Expatriate footballers in Brazil
Expatriate footballers in Chile
Expatriate footballers in Spain
Uruguayan expatriate footballers
Uruguayan expatriate sportspeople in Brazil
Uruguayan expatriate sportspeople in Chile
Uruguayan expatriate sportspeople in Colombia
Uruguayan expatriate sportspeople in Spain
Uruguayan football managers
Uruguayan people of Polish descent
Uruguayan people of Spanish descent
Peñarol managers
Respiratory disease deaths in Uruguay
Burials at Parque del Recuerdo (Uruguay)
Racing Club de Montevideo players
Expatriate footballers in Colombia